Hector "Hec" Pothier (born June 12, 1954) is a former professional Canadian football player with the Canadian Football League's Edmonton Eskimos.  After playing college football at McGill University and at St. Mary's University (Halifax), Pothier spent his entire 12 year CFL career as an offensive lineman.  He was named CFL All-Star 2 times and was a part of six Grey Cup championship teams with the Eskimos.

References 

1954 births
Living people
Canadian football offensive linemen
Edmonton Elks players
Franco-Ontarian people
McGill Redbirds football players
Players of Canadian football from Ontario
Saint Mary's University (Halifax) alumni
Sportspeople from St. Catharines